The 2016 ITF Men's Circuit is the 2016 edition of the second-tier tour for men's professional tennis. It is organised by the International Tennis Federation and is a tier below the ATP Tour. The ITF Men's Circuit includes tournaments with prize money ranging from $10,000 up to $25,000.

Participating host nations

Countries that are hosting a tournament in 2016, but did not in 2015.

Schedule

Key

January–March

April–June

July–September

October–December

Point distribution

See also 
 2016 ATP World Tour
 2016 ATP Challenger Tour
 2016 ITF Women's Circuit

References

External links 
 International Tennis Federation (ITF)

 
2016
2016 in tennis